The Nippon Professional Baseball All-Star Game is an annual baseball series of All-Star Games (in most years, two games are played, but three such games can and have been played as well) between players from the Central League and the Pacific League, currently selected by a combination of fans, players, coaches, and managers. The All-Star Game usually occurs in early to mid-July and marks the symbolic halfway point in the Nippon Professional Baseball (NPB) season (though not the mathematical halfway point; in most seasons, that takes place one week earlier).

History 
The first NPB All-Star game was played in 1951.

For many years, mimicking the gaijin waku rule of the NPB, each All-Star team was limited to two foreign players.

Game results

See also
Major League Baseball All-Star Game
Baseball awards#Japan

References

1951 establishments in Japan
All-star games
Nippon Professional Baseball competitions
Recurring sporting events established in 1951